Seven-ball (or sevenball, 7 ball, 7-ball and other variant spellings) may refer to:

7 ball, the pool (pocket billiards) ball numbered "7", and traditionally brown or maroon, but tan in some ball sets
7 ball, the black snooker ball, worth 7 points, normally referred to as "the black"
Seven-ball, a pool (pocket billiards) game, played with seven object balls, of which the 7 ball  is the game-winning ball
7-Ball, the United States Army 101st Airborne Division Band Barbershop Quartet, whose logo features a pool 7 ball (see above)
 7-ball, a seven-dimensional -ball in mathematics
 Seven Balls, a Grade-II-listed pub at Kenton Lane, Harrow Weald, London, dating to ca. the 17th century